The Pacheco Pass AVA is an American Viticultural Area located in the Santa Clara and San Benito counties of California, near Pacheco Pass. It is part of the larger San Francisco Bay AVA. State Route 152 passes through the center of the wine region. Pacheco Pass was granted AVA status in 1984 following a petition by the Zanger family, who continue to operate the only commercial winery in the appellation, Zanger Vineyards.

References

External links
 TTB AVA Maps

American Viticultural Areas of California
American Viticultural Areas of the San Francisco Bay Area
Diablo Range
Geography of Santa Clara County, California
Geography of San Benito County, California
1984 establishments in California
American Viticultural Areas